Care may refer to:

Organizations and projects

 CARE (New Zealand), Citizens Association for Racial Equality, a former New Zealand organisation
 CARE (relief agency), "Cooperative for Assistance and Relief Everywhere", an international aid and development organization
 Care.com, a company operating an online portal
 Carpet America Recovery Effort, an American carpet recycling project
 Charged Aerosol Release Experiment, a NASA project concerning dust in space
 Christian Action Research and Education, a Christian lobby group in the United Kingdom 
 Control and Rehabilitation Effort, a behavior modification program implemented in 1968 at United States Penitentiary, Marion
 Credit Abuse Resistance Education, an American national program
 Crew Module Atmospheric Re-entry Experiment, a 2014 ISRO experimental vehicle

People with the surname
 Danny Care (soccer) (born 1974), American soccer player
 Danny Care (born 1987), English rugby union player
 Henry Care (1646–1688), English political writer and journalist
 Peter Care (born 1953), British film and video producer
 Terry John Care (born 1947), American politician

Philosophy and science
Care or Sorge, a term in Heideggerian terminology
 Cura (mythology) or Care, figure in ancient Roman Fabulae of Hyginus
 Duty of care, a legal obligation in tort law
 Ethics of care, a normative ethical theory
 Theology of relational care, a theology of understanding how contemporary followers of Jesus can relate to others
 Vulnerability and Care Theory of Love, the view that care is an integral part of romantic love

Social concepts
 Child care, the act of caring for and supervising minor children
 Day care, the care of a child during the day by a person other than the child's parents or legal guardians
 Elderly care, the fulfillment of the special needs and requirements that are unique to senior citizens
 Foster care, a system by which a certified, stand-in "parent(s)" cares for minor children or young people
 Health care, the treatment and management of illness, and the preservation of health through services offered
 Care of residents, care given to adults or children outside of the patient's home
 Home care, health care or supportive care provided in the patient's home by healthcare professionals
 Primary care, routine health care, usually the first provided a patient sees
 Primary healthcare, a series of principles geared towards making health care available
 Intensive care medicine, provision of life support or organ support systems in patients who are critically ill
 Managed care, a variety of techniques intended to reduce the cost of providing health benefits and improve the quality of care
 Palliative care

Music
 Care (band), a 1980s alternative rock band from Liverpool
 Care (How to Dress Well album), 2016
 Care (Shriekback album), 1983
 Care, a song by Beabadoobee

Film and television
 Care (film), a 2000 British television crime drama film
 "Care", a 2001 episode of Law & Order: Special Victims Unit
 "Care" (Law & Order: UK), the 2009 premiere episode of the British television series, Law & Order: UK
 A 2018 BBC drama co-written by Jimmy McGovern

Other uses 
 Cahir, a town in County Tipperary, Ireland (pronounced roughly 'care')
 Career Average Revalued Earnings, or CARE, part of the recommendations in the UK's Independent Public Services Pensions Commission report
 Continuous time Algebraic Riccati equation, or CARE, a matrix equation

See also
 
 Cair (disambiguation)
 Cares (disambiguation)
 Carle (disambiguation)
 Cari (disambiguation)
 Carre (disambiguation)
 Kare (disambiguation)